Ibrahim Nuhu Chibsah born (11 April 1952) is a Ghanaian politician and a member of the first Parliament of the fourth Republic representing the Old Tafo Suame constituency in the Ashanti region.

Early life and education
Ibrahim Nuhu Chibsah was born on 11 April 1952 at Old Tafo in the Ashanti region of Ghana. He attended the Adabie Commercial Institute in Kumasi and obtained his Road Safety Audit Stage 1 certificate after studying commerce.

Politics
Chibsah was first elected into Parliament on the ticket of the National Democratic Congress during the 1992 Ghanaian parliamentary election for the Old Tafo Suame constituency in the Ashanti region. He lost to Paul Yeboah R. K in the 1996 Parliamentary primaries.

Career
Chibsah is a clerk by profession and a former member of parliament for the Old Tafo Suame Constituency in the Ashanti Region of Ghana.

Personal life
He is a Christian.

References

Living people
1952 births
Clerks
National Democratic Congress (Ghana) politicians
People from Ashanti Region
Ghanaian MPs 1993–1997
Ghanaian Christians
21st-century Ghanaian politicians